Sarvestan (also Romanized as Sarvestān; also known as Sardestān and Sarvistān) is a village in Howmeh Rural District, in the Central District of Bam County, Kerman Province, Iran. At the 2006 census, its population was 404, in 82 families.

References 

Populated places in Bam County